The Lisbon Main Street Historic District is a nationally recognized historic district located in Lisbon, Iowa, United States.  It was listed on the National Register of Historic Places in 2019.  At the time of its nomination it consisted of 15 contributing buildings along most of the 100 blocks of East and West Main Street in the central business district. The city was settled by German immigrants who were affiliated with the United Brethren Church. They recruited others from their home area to settle here as well. The railroad was built through town in 1859, and commercial development began thereafter. Most of the historic buildings were constructed between 1875 and 1899 with the Lisbon Library being the oldest.

References

Historic districts in Linn County, Iowa
National Register of Historic Places in Linn County, Iowa
Historic districts on the National Register of Historic Places in Iowa
Lisbon, Iowa